Aerides orthocentra is a species of epiphytic orchid endemic to the Yunnan region of China.

References

Orchids of Yunnan
Endemic flora of Yunnan
Orchids of China
Endemic orchids of China
Epiphytic orchids
Plants described in 1938
orthocentra